Mavis Henrietta Irene Hamilton married name Mavis Macnaughton (1911–1958), was a female Irish badminton international.

Badminton career
Mavis born in 1911 won three Scottish Open titles (including two singles) and four Irish Open titles (three under her married name of Macnaughton).

Family
Mavis came from a famous sporting playing family. Her father Blayney Hamilton was a badminton and cricket international, her uncle William Drummond Hamilton represented Ireland at cricket and tennis, another uncle Willoughby Hamilton was world ranked number one at tennis at one time and a third uncle Francis Cole Lowry Hamilton played cricket for Ireland. In addition two of her siblings were badminton internationals (Willoughby Hamilton and Arthur Hamilton).

References

Irish female badminton players
1911 births
1958 deaths
Hamilton family (Ireland)